= World Volleyball Championships =

World Volleyball Championships may refer to

- FIVB Volleyball Men's World Championship
- FIVB Volleyball Women's World Championship
